Marcel Desprets (19 August 1906 – 12 March 1973) was a French fencer. He won a gold medal in the team épée event at the 1948 Summer Olympics.

References

External links
 

1906 births
1973 deaths
French male épée fencers
Olympic fencers of France
Fencers at the 1948 Summer Olympics
Olympic gold medalists for France
Olympic medalists in fencing
Medalists at the 1948 Summer Olympics
20th-century French people